Bracca maculosa is a moth of the family Geometridae. It is found in Sumatra, Peninsular Malaysia, Borneo and Palawan.

Subspecies
Bracca maculosa maculosa (Sumatra, Peninsular Malaysia, Borneo)
Bracca maculosa radiolata (Palawan)

External links
The Moths of Borneo

Boarmiini
Moths described in 1856